Munden is a surname. The surname derives from Great Munden or Little Munden in Hertfordshire, England. People with the name include:

 Bob Munden
 Carri Munden
 Donald Munden
 John Munden
 Joseph Shepherd Munden
 Marc Munden
 Marwood Munden
 Paul Munden
 Richard Munden (British Army officer)
 Richard Munden (Royal Navy officer)
 Victor Munden

References